Faveria poliostrota is a species of moth in the family Pyralidae. It was described by Boris Balinsky in 1994 and is found in South Africa.

References

Endemic moths of South Africa
Moths described in 1994
Phycitini
Moths of Africa